Cabrol is a French surname of Occitan origin. It is believed to be derived from the Latin word capreolus, meaning deer.

Notable people
Notable people who have this surname include:
 Agnès Cabrol (1964-2007), French Egyptologist
 Ariadna Cabrol (b. 1982), Spanish actress 
 Darío Cabrol (b. 1972), Argentinian footballer
 Fernand Cabrol (1855–1937), French theologian
 Raoul Cabrol (1895–1956), French caricaturist

References

Occitan-language surnames